The Carleton Ravens women's basketball team represent Carleton University in the Ontario University Athletics of U Sports women's basketball. The Ravens have won two national championships, in 2018 and 2023. The Ravens have also won the OUA Critelli Cup conference championship three times, in 2017, 2018, and 2023. Between 2009 and 2018, the Ruth Coe Award, recognizing Carleton University’s Female Athlete of the Year, was won by seven female basketball players. Additionally, the program served as host team for the 2020 U Sports Women's Basketball Championship, contested at Ottawa's TD Place Arena.

In 2023, both the women’s and men’s teams won the national titles, something no school had accomplished since 1985, when the Victoria Vikes were double champions.

History
From 2007 to 2019, the Ravens were coached by Taffe Charles. An assistant coach with the women’s program in 1995, he would join Dave Smart’s coaching staff with the Ravens men’s team in 1998, enjoying five U SPORTS national championships, before returning to the women’s program in 2007.

Under Charles’ leadership, the women’s team captured the 2010 OUA East Division title, qualifying for the OUA East postseason finals. It would mark the first of five division titles. The Ravens would top the East Division in 2013, 2014 and 2018, while the 2016-17 season saw a first place finish in the OUA North Division. Clinching its first appearance in the U Sports Final 8 in 2011, the program would return to the biggest stage in Canadian university basketball in 2013, 2017 and 2018.

The 2012-13 season saw the Ravens among the top five in the national basketball rankings, defeating the Ottawa Gee-Gees to win the East Division Final. Finishing the 2016-17 season with an 18-1 mark, its highest win total in the 45-year history of the program (since broken), the Ravens would enjoy the milestone of a number-1 ranking in the national polls, reaching the summit on November 15, 2016. Reaching the U Sports Final 8, the Ravens defeated the Victoria Vikes in the quarterfinals, enjoying their first-ever win at the tournament.

Winning the OUA conference title in 2017 and 2018, the Ravens enjoyed a perfect 29-0 record, for their first-ever undefeated season, capturing the Bronze Baby for the first time in 2018. Defensively, the Ravens stymied their competition during the championship season, averaging merely 45.9 points per game, resulting in the finest defense in U Sports.

Elizabeth Leblanc was a key player during the 2017-18 season, culminating in a perfect 29-0 season, highlighted by the program's first national championship. Statistically, Leblanc averaged 26.7 minutes per game, signifying her third straight season of leading the team. With 10.8 points, 4.8 rebounds, 2.7 assists and 1.1 blocks per game, Leblanc also won the U Sports Defensive Player of the Year Award, the first player in Ravens history to do so.

The season also saw Heather Lindsay garner some hardware, capturing the Carleton Ravens Athletics Outstanding Graduating Female Athlete award. In what proved to be her last campaign as a Raven, Lindsay reached the plateau of 100 regular season appearances, complemented by 82 starts. With career averages of 11.1 points, 9.3 rebounds and 1.4 blocks per game, she graduated by surpassing the 1000-point career mark.

During the 2018-19 season, Nicole Gilmore reached career-highs in many categories. Starting with 14.3 points-per-game, 7.7 rebounds per game, plus shooting 40.5 per cent from the field, she received the Carleton Ravens Outstanding Graduating Female Athlete Award.

Season-by-season record

Capital Hoops Classic

Individual leader scoring

International
 Catherine Traer : 2017 Summer Universiade
Nicole Gilmore  2019 Summer Universiade

Awards and honours
2016-17 U Sports Rebounding Champion: Heather Lindsay (10.8 rebounds per game)

All-Canadians
2018-19 Second Team All-Canadian: Nicole Gilmore

OUA Awards
2009-10 OUA East Coach of the Year: Taffe Charles
2013-14 OUA All-Rookie Team: Heather Lindsay
2017-18 OUA Coach of the Year and the :Taffe Charles
2018-19 OUA Defensive Player of the Year: Nicole Gilmore

OUA All-Stars
First team
2018-19 OUA First-Team All-Star: Nicole Gilmore
2016-17 OUA First-Team: Heather Lindsay
2016-17 OUA First-Team: Catherine Traer

Second team
2017-18: OUA Second Team All-Star - Heather Lindsay
2016-17 Second Team: Elizabeth Leblanc
2015-16: OUA Second Team All-Star - Heather Lindsay

OUA Showcase
2019 Showcase Participant: Alyssa Cerino, Carleton (named to Team Burns) 
2019 Showcase Participant: Nicole Gilmore, Carleton (named to Team Belanger)
2018 OUA Showcase Participant: Alexandra Trivieri (named to Team Charles)

U Sports Awards
2016-17: U SPORTS Second-Team All-Canadian - Heather Lindsay
2017-18: Elizabeth Leblanc U SPORTS Defensive Player of the Year award
2017-18 Peter Ennis Award as U SPORTS national coach of the year: Taffe Charles

U Sports nationals
  2018 U SPORTS Final 8 Championship MVP: Elizabeth Leblanc
  2018 U SPORTS Final 8 Championship All-Tournament Team: Elizabeth Leblanc

U Sports All-Canadians
2019 Second Team All-Canadian: Nicole Gilmore

University honors
2016-17 Pat O’Brien Award – Carleton Ravens Athletics Coach of the Year: Taffe Charles
2017-18 Pat O’Brien Award – Carleton Ravens Athletics Coach of the Year: Taffe Charles

Ruth Coe Award
2010-11: Alyson Bush
2016-17: Heather Lindsay - Ruth Coe Award winner as Carleton Ravens Athletics Female Athlete of the Year
2017-18: Elizabeth Leblanc - Ruth Coe Award winner as Carleton Ravens Athletics Female Athlete of the Year

Outstanding Graduating Women’s Athlete of the Year

2011-12: Ashleigh Cleary - Carleton Ravens athletics Outstanding Graduating Women’s Athlete of the Year
2017-18: Heather Lindsay - Carleton Ravens athletics Outstanding Graduating Women’s Athlete of the Year
2018-19: Nicole Gilmore - Carleton Ravens athletics Outstanding Graduating Women’s Athlete of the Year

Team awards
This is an incomplete list

Most Valuable Player
1996-97: Karin Brown
1997-98: Rosie Warden
1998-99: Rosie Warden
1999-00: Tamara McNulty
2000-01: Rosie Warden
2001-02: Anne McDonnell
2002-03: Dasa Farthing
2003-04: Ashley Kimmett
2004-05: Sarah Kennedy
2005-06: Dasa Farthing
2006-07: Susan Shaw-Davis
2007-08: Tanya Perry
2008-09: Ines Jelic
2010-11: Ashleigh Clearly
2011-12: Kendall MacLeod
2012-13: Alyson Bush
2013-14: Alyson Bush
2014-15: Lindsay Shotbolt
2015-16: Heather Lindsay
2016-17: Heather Lindsay
2019-20: Alyssa Cerino

Alumni Award
2014-15: Abeer Farhat
2015-16: Abeer Farhat

References 

Sport in Ottawa
Carleton Ravens basketball
 
U Sports women's basketball teams
Basketball teams in Ontario
Women in Ontario